The second inauguration of Jakaya Kikwete as the 4th President of Tanzania took place on Saturday, 6 November 2010. The inauguration marked the beginning of the second and final term of Jakaya Kikwete as President and Mohamed Gharib Bilal as Vice President.

Attendance

Dignitaries

References

External links
 Inauguration images
 

Jakaya Kikwete
Tanzanian presidential inaugurations